Aníbal Ruiz Leites (30 December 1942 – 10 March 2017) was a Uruguayan association football coach.

Death 
On March 10, 2017, while serving as assistant manager to lead manager José Cardozo at Puebla, Ruiz collapsed on the pitch of the Luis "Pirata" Fuente Stadium in Veracruz while the team was warming up. Ruiz later died as a result of a heart attack on the way to a local hospital.

References

External links 
Profile on the FIFA World Cup web site

1942 births
2017 deaths
Uruguayan footballers
Danubio F.C. players
Sud América players
Cúcuta Deportivo footballers
Deportivo Anzoátegui players
Montevideo Wanderers F.C. players
A.D. Ramonense players
Miramar Misiones players
Expatriate footballers in Colombia
Expatriate footballers in Costa Rica
Expatriate footballers in Peru
Expatriate footballers in Venezuela
Uruguayan expatriate sportspeople in Colombia
Uruguayan expatriate sportspeople in Costa Rica
Uruguayan expatriate sportspeople in Peru
Uruguayan expatriate sportspeople in Venezuela
Uruguayan football managers
Club Olimpia managers
Club Guaraní managers
Club Necaxa managers
Correcaminos UAT managers
C.D. Veracruz managers
Club Puebla managers
Club León managers
S.D. Quito managers
Atlético Nacional managers
Montevideo Wanderers managers
C.S.D. Municipal managers
Expatriate football managers in Guatemala
Expatriate football managers in Argentina
Expatriate football managers in Colombia
Expatriate football managers in Ecuador
Expatriate football managers in El Salvador
Expatriate football managers in Mexico
Expatriate football managers in Paraguay
Expatriate football managers in Peru
Paraguay national football team managers
El Salvador national football team managers
2006 FIFA World Cup managers
Cúcuta Deportivo managers
Association football midfielders
Footballers from Salto, Uruguay
Universidad San Martín managers
León de Huánuco managers